USAT Brigadier General M. G. Zalinski was a U.S. Army transport ship that served in World War II. It sank in 1946 in the Grenville Channel in British Columbia's Inside Passage.
The crew were rescued by a tug boat and the  passenger steamer, but the cargo of bombs and oil went down with the ship.

Ship history
The ship was built as the Lake Frohna (hull number 765) at the American Ship Building Company in Lorain, Ohio as a cargo vessel for the United States Shipping Board, and was delivered in June 1919. In 1924, she was sold to the Ace Steamship Company and renamed Ace. She changed hands again in 1930, being sold to the Terminals & Transportation Corporation of Duluth. Finally, in 1941, she became the Brigadier General M. G. Zalinski in the employ of the U.S. War Department.

Sinking
On 26 September 1946 the Zalinski was en route from Seattle to Whittier, Alaska, with a cargo of army supplies when she ran into the rocks of Pitt Island in the Grenville Channel, 55 miles south of Prince Rupert. The ship sank within twenty minutes, while her crew of 48 were rescued by the tug Sally N and the passenger steamer SS Catala. According to a report in The Vancouver Sun of 30 September 1946, at the time of her sinking she was transporting a cargo of at least twelve  bombs, large amounts of .30 and .50 caliber ammunition, at least 700 tonnes of bunker oil, and truck axles with army type tires.

Discovery
On 20 September 2003, the United States Coast Guard Cutter  reported an oil slick off Lowe Inlet. It was investigated by the Canadian Coast Guard Ship Tanu three days later, which obtained oil samples, but was unable to discover the source. In early October 2003, a commercial airline pilot reported further pollution. The Canadian Coast Guard confirmed the presence of the slick, and discovered that some three miles of shoreline had been affected. Again, no source was found, and the Coast Guard suspected that the oil could be surfacing from an old wreck.

By mid-November, divers had been sent down twice to plug leaks in the hull. When investigations revealed that the ship was the Brigadier General M.G. Zalinski, and contained munitions, all operations were halted until an assessment was completed and the site declared safe. The Canadian government is currently developing a plan to remove all the oil and munitions.

Cleanup
The vessel has been leaking oil for some time.
In May 2012 the Vancouver Sun and The Globe and Mail reported that new concerns over leaking oil have triggered emergency plans to deal with the leaking oil. In July 2013 the Canadian government announced a "significant environmental protection operation" to clean up the wreck site. 

However, by December 4, 2013 only 35 tons of fuel oil was recovered; Environmental Protection Operation came to the end and Brigadier General M. G. Zalinski was declared free of oil and safe for environment.

Canadian Coast Guard was conducting dive operations on the wreck 7 to 20 March 2018.

References

 

Design 1093 ships
Ships built in Lorain, Ohio
1919 ships
Design 1093 ships of the United States Army
Shipwrecks in the Pacific Ocean
Maritime incidents in 1946